Herbert Wilson Erskine (August 27, 1888 – March 18, 1951) was a United States district judge of the United States District Court for the Northern District of California.

Education and career

Born in San Francisco, California, Erskine received an Artium Baccalaureus degree from the University of California, Berkeley in 1908 and was in private practice in San Francisco from 1909 to 1949. He was special counsel for the California Toll Bridge Authority from 1939 to 1940. He was a California commissioner to the Golden Gate International Exposition from 1939 to 1940.

Federal judicial service

On January 13, 1949, Erskine was nominated by President Harry S. Truman to a seat on the United States District Court for the Northern District of California vacated by Judge Adolphus Frederic St. Sure. Erskine was confirmed by the United States Senate on February 25, 1949, and received his commission on March 1, 1949. Erskine served in that capacity until his death, just over two years later on March 18, 1951.

References

Sources
 

1888 births
1951 deaths
University of California, Berkeley alumni
Judges of the United States District Court for the Northern District of California
United States district court judges appointed by Harry S. Truman
20th-century American judges